Blessing Anyanwu Chinedu (born November 22, 1976 in Enyimba) is a retired Nigerian football defender.

Career
In his early career he played in Nigeria with Enyimba International F.C. and Iwuanyanwu Nationale (former name of Heartland FC). In 2000, he moved to Macedonia where he signed for the traditionally strongest club FK Vardar. Between 2001 and 2003 he played with another Macedonian First League club, FK Cementarnica 55 before returning to Vardar. In 2005, he moved to Belgium signing with Belgian Pro League club K.A.A. Gent. After one season he moved to another Belgian club, Lierse S.K.

National team
Chinedu was part of Nigerian under-17 squad at the 1993 FIFA U-17 World Championship.

References

1976 births
Living people
People from Aba, Abia
Nigerian footballers
Association football defenders
Enyimba F.C. players
Heartland F.C. players
FK Vardar players
FK Cementarnica 55 players
K.A.A. Gent players
Lierse S.K. players
Belgian Pro League players
Nigerian expatriate footballers
Expatriate footballers in North Macedonia
Expatriate footballers in Belgium
Nigerian expatriate sportspeople in North Macedonia
Nigerian expatriate sportspeople in Belgium